Tricarpelema giganteum is a monocotyledonous herbaceous plant in the family Commelinaceae. It is native to eastern India and Bhutan. Tricarpelema giganteum serves as the type species for the genus.

References 

Flora of Assam (region)
Flora of Bhutan
Plants described in 1870
giganteum